San Pa Muang is a village and tambon (subdistrict) of Mueang Phayao District, in Phayao Province, Thailand. In 2005 it had a total population of 3056 people. It is located in the south-western part of the province not far from the border with Lampang Province. It lies along the 1193 road, north of Ban Tun and north-west of Wiang. The village is noted for its Water-Hyacinth Handicraft Centre.

References

Tambon of Phayao province
Populated places in Phayao province